Stephen T. Blackehart (born December 1, 1967) is an American character actor, author, and producer.

Education
Blackehart began his artistic education at the University of South Florida under BAFTA-winning character actor Paul Massie, before moving overseas to attend the London Academy of Music and Dramatic Art. While at LAMDA, in addition to the normal study-and-performance curriculum, Blackehart studied swordsmanship under renowned fight masters Rodney Cottier and John Waller, and went on to attain an advanced certification from the Society of British Fight Directors (now called the BASSC). Upon returning to the U.S., he became an active member of Manhattan's Westside Repertory Theatre (at the time the oldest classical theater company in the city), and by day studied at HB Studio under Uta Hagen and with character actor William Hickey.

Career 
Blackehart first became known for playing Benny Que in the cult classic film Tromeo and Juliet, though he has since acted in a mixture of B-movies (Retro Puppet Master, The Land That Time Forgot) and mainstream films, many of which are associated with James Gunn (The Belko Experiment, Super, Guardians of the Galaxy, The Suicide Squad), whom he met while working on Tromeo.

In addition to his film work, Blackehart has acted in TV series including Grey's Anatomy, Star Trek: Deep Space Nine, and The Orville. He was a regular on the BBC's The Tromaville Cafe, where he originated the role of Felix, the French Trickster.

In 2004, Blackehart produced Jenna Fischer's mockumentary film LolliLove. It was subsequently picked up for distribution by Troma and garnered DVD Talk's distinction as a "Collector's Series" disc immediately upon its video release.
 It was also voted #2 by the editors of Amazon in their list of Best DVDs of the Year - Comedy, and completely sold out of all copies within the first day of release.

In 2008 and 2009, he produced the comedy web series PG Porn and Humanzee! for filmmaker James Gunn.

In November 2014, he published a collection of novellas entitled A Stranger to the Darklands and Other Tales.

Personal life
Blackehart is from Hell's Kitchen, New York. It has been reported that Blackehart was born as Stefano Brando and is the son of late actor Marlon Brando, though Blackehart denies that he is related.

Filmography

Film

Television

Awards
 Shared the 2005 Kodak Independent Soul Award with Jenna Fischer for their film, LolliLove

References

External links
 
 

American male television actors
American male film actors
Living people
Male actors from New York City
Alumni of the London Academy of Music and Dramatic Art
Place of birth missing (living people)
University of South Florida alumni
1967 births